Jaan Tõnisson's fourth cabinet was in office in Estonia from 18 May 1933 to 21 October 1933, when it was succeeded by Konstantin Päts' fifth cabinet.

Members

This cabinet's members were the following:

References

Cabinets of Estonia